Samasthanam is a 2002 Tamil-language drama film directed by Raj Kapoor. The film stars R. Sarathkumar in dual role, Suresh Gopi, Devayani, and Abhirami. It was released on 27 September 2002.

Plot

Thiru and Surya are inseparable friends. They are so close to each other that Thiru selects a bride for Surya and vice versa. Their friendship is carried over from their grandfathers and fathers, who were thick friends. Thiru brings up Surya's daughter because he has no children. Shankara wants to separate them and does all he could to. Surya's sister becomes pregnant due to a love affair with Shankara's brother. On the eve of her wedding, Divya, Thiru's wife, helps her run away with the guy she loves. This breaks the friendship between the two as Surya's mother poisons his ears against Thiru. As expected, Shankara is behind this because he wants to avenge the death of his father Easwaramoorthy, who was killed by Thiru's father Vetrishwaran, an honest police inspector. Finally, in the climax, the two destroy Shankara, resolve their differences, and unite in the end.

Cast

R. Sarathkumar as Thiru and Inspector Vetreshwaran 
Suresh Gopi as Surya
Devayani as Divya
Abhirami as Aisha
Goundamani
Senthil
Ashish Vidyarthi as Shankara
Vadivukkarasi as Surya's mother
Chandrasekhar as Sundarapandian, Surya's father
Manivannan as Paraman
Sabitha Anand as Parama's wife
Raj Kapoor as Eswaramoorthy, Shankara's father
Viji Chandrasekhar as Shankara's mother
Ramji as Deva
Haripriya as Kavya
Rishikeshav as Jeeva
Lavanya as Sudha
Vinod Kishan as Young Shankara

Soundtrack

The film score and the soundtrack were composed by Deva. The soundtrack, released in 2002, features 6 tracks with lyrics written by Pa. Vijay and Na. Muthukumar.

Reception
The Hindu wrote "Lengthy flashbacks and unwarranted song sequences mar the tempo of Samasthanam. The story is strong, but the screenplay lacks crispness". Sify wrote "The director of the film Raj Kapur has not been able to come out with anything new as this film stretches beyond belief and endurance too". Chennai Online wrote "director [..] moving his narration steadily through clichéd scenes and predictable situations".

References

2002 films
Films shot in Ooty
Films scored by Deva (composer)
2000s Tamil-language films
Indian action drama films
2002 action drama films
Films directed by Raj Kapoor (Tamil film director)